Hiroshi Abe is the name of:

People
 Hiroshi Abe (actor) (born 1964), Japanese model and actor
 Hiroshi Abe (astronomer) (born 1958), Japanese amateur astronomer affiliated with the Yatsuka Observatory
 Hiroshi Abe (war criminal) (born c.1922), former Japanese soldier

Fictional characters 
 Hiroshi Abe, a character in the manga series Shonan Junai Gumi